David Booth may refer to:

 David A. Booth (born 1938), British scientist in the field of food intake-related behaviour
 Dave Booth (born 1948), English football manager in England and India
 David Booth (basketball) (born 1970), American professional basketball player
 David Booth (ice hockey) (born 1984), American hockey player currently playing for the Detroit Red Wings
 David G. Booth (born c. 1946), investment manager and donor to the University of Chicago and the University of Kansas
 Peter Booth (priest) (1907–1993), born David Herbert Booth, British priest and headmaster
 David Gore-Booth (1943–2004), British diplomat